Spaceship paradox or rocket paradox could refer to:

 Bell's spaceship paradox, a relativistic paradox
 Pendulum rocket fallacy, a simple mechanical paradox relating to rocket stability